Curran Walters (born January 16, 1998) is an American actor and model. He is best known for portraying Jason Todd on the DC Universe / HBO Max superhero series Titans (2018–Present).

Early life
Walters was born on January 16, 1998, in Oak Park, California and attended Oak Park High School. He has a younger sister, Harlowe Walters.

Career 
He began modeling for fashion brands including Tillys and Lee. He began his acting career in commercials for Samsung Galaxy and the sports video game NBA 2K15. He made his television debut in the comedy film Growing Up and Down in 2014. Curran got more roles on television, including his recurring role as "Young Jackson" in the series Game of Silence in 2016. He also appeared in the first and second two-part episode (8 & 9) of "Girl Meets Ski Lodge" in 2016 during the third season of Girl Meets World as Evan. Other television credits include Too Close to Home in 2016, Alexa & Katie in 2018, and the 2016 sitcom Speechless.

He made his second film appearance in the comedy-drama 20th Century Women in 2016, starring Annette Bening, Elle Fanning and Greta Gerwig. Walters made his third film appearance in the science fiction film for television Playing Dead in 2018.

Walters made his breakthrough as Jason Todd, the second Robin, in the fifth episode of Titans and had a recurring role in the series throughout the rest of the first season. For the second season in 2019, Walters returned as a series regular. He is the first live action portrayal of Jason Todd in the character's history. He booked the role after just one audition after the callbacks were canceled. He later appeared as the character in the CW's Supergirl for the "Crisis on Infinite Earths" crossover event, alongside Alan Ritchson's Hawk, via archive footage from the first season of Titans. Walters returned for the third season of Titans, where his character took up the mantle of Red Hood.

He appeared in the 2019 horror film Do Not Reply.

Filmography

Film

Television

References

External links

1998 births
Living people
21st-century American male actors
People from Oak Park, California
American male television actors